Somatidia fulvipes is a species of beetle in the family Cerambycidae. It was described by Broun in 1923.

References

fulvipes
Beetles described in 1923